An in-chambers opinion is an opinion by a single justice or judge of a multi-member appellate court, rendered on an issue that the court's rules or procedures allow a single member of the court to decide. The judge is said to decide the matter "in chambers" because the decision can be issued from the judge's chambers without a formal court proceeding.

Supreme Court of the United States
Each Justice of the Supreme Court of the United States is assigned as the "Circuit Justice" to one or more of the 13 judicial circuits. The role of the Circuit Justice has changed over time, but has included addressing certain types of applications arising within the Circuit.

Under current practice, the Circuit Justice for each circuit is responsible for dealing with certain types of applications that, under the Court's rules, may be addressed by a single Justice. These include emergency applications for stays (including requests for stays of execution in death-penalty cases) and injunctions pursuant to the All Writs Act arising from cases within that circuit, as well as more routine matters such as requests for extensions of time. In the past, Circuit Justices also sometimes ruled on motions for bail in criminal cases, writs of habeas corpus, and applications for writs of error granting permission to appeal.

Most often, a Justice will dispose of such an application by simply noting that it is "Granted" or "Denied," or by entering a standard form of order unaccompanied by a written opinion. However, a Justice may elect to author an opinion explaining his or her reasons for granting or denying relief. Such an opinion is referred to as an "in-chambers opinion" or an "opinion in chambers." On occasion, Justices have also issued single-Justice in-chambers opinions on other matters, such as explaining why they have chosen not to recuse themselves from participating in a particular case before the Court.

The Justices author and publish fewer in-chambers opinions today than they did during the twentieth century; it has been rare in recent years for there to be more than one or two such opinions published per term.

Since 1969, in-chambers opinions that a Justice wishes to have published have appeared in the Court's official reporter, the United States Reports. They appear in a separate section at the back of each volume that contains one or more such opinions. Before 1969, in-chambers opinions did not appear in the U.S. Reports, although they were occasionally published in other reporters or in legal periodicals. During the 1990s, the Supreme Court Clerk's Office compiled a collection of in-chambers opinions contained in the Court's records and other sources. The collection was subsequently published in a three-volume edition by the Green Bag Press, and is supplemented from time to time.

Other American appellate courts
The rules of some other multi-member American appellate courts sometimes authorize a single judge or justice to take certain actions. Sometimes these actions are procedural in nature, such as granting extensions of time or granting or denying permission to file an amicus curiae brief. In other courts, the powers of a single judge can be more extensive; for example, in the New York Court of Appeals, a single judge rules on a defendant's motion for leave to appeal in a criminal case, and his or her decision is final.

It is relatively unusual for single judges or justices of lower courts to issue opinions explaining their rulings on these matters, but when they do, the designation "in chambers" is sometimes used.

References
Frank Felleman & John C. Wright, Note, "The Powers of a Supreme Court Justice Acting in an Individual Capacity", 112 U. Pa. L. Rev. 981 (1964).
Daniel Gonen, "Judging in Chambers: The Powers of a Single Justice of the Supreme Court", 76 U. Cinn. L. Rev. 1159 (2008).
Stephen M. Shapiro et al., Supreme Court Practice, ch. 17 (10th ed. 2013).
Ira Brad Matetsky, "The Publication and Location of In-Chambers Opinions", introduction to 4 Cynthia Rapp & Ross E. Davies, eds., In Chambers Opinions by the Justices of the Supreme Court of the United States (Green Bag Press supp. 2, 2005).
Sandra Day O'Connor, "The Changing Role of the Circuit Justice", 17 U. Toledo L. Rev. 521 (1986).
Cynthia Rapp, "In Chambers Opinions by Justices of the Supreme Court", 5 Green Bag 2d 175 (2002).
Cynthia Rapp, Introduction to 1 Cynthia Rapp & Ross E. Davies, eds., In Chambers Opinions by the Justices of the Supreme Court of the United States, p. v (2004).
Stephen M. Shapiro & Miriam R. Nemetz, "An Introduction to In-Chambers Opinions", 2 Cynthia Rapp & Ross E. Davies, eds., In Chambers Opinions by the Justices of the Supreme Court of the United States (2004).

Legal procedure
Judicial legal terminology
Court orders
American legal terminology
Supreme Court of the United States